Dude Walker is an American voice-over talent and actor based in New York City. He is known for his voice-over work in video games, movies, TV shows,  and radio.

Filmography

Television series
 Dead Silent - Himself - Narrator
 House of Cards - Presiding Officer
 The West Wing - Simon
 The High Court with Doug Benson - Narrator
 Celebrity Watch Party - Narrator

Shorts
 Unrequited - Bob Hendry

Movies
 Minority Report - Reporter

Video games
 Grand Theft Auto: Episodes from Liberty City - Ram Jam FM Imaging
 Heroes of Newerth - Odin Allfather
 Star Wars: The Old Republic - Ardun Kothe, Security Officer Stansun, Additional Voices
 Star Wars: The Old Republic - Shadow of Revan - Ardun Kothe, Additional Voices
 The Elder Scrolls III: Morrowind

Documentary
 China... Thru' My Eyes!
 Dead Harvest - Dead Harvest Narrator
 Space Voyages - Himself - Narrator
 Undateable

References

External links
Official website

Place of birth missing (living people)
American male voice actors
American radio personalities
Year of birth missing (living people)
Living people